This is a list from 19 July 1999.



A

Niall Andrews
Roberta Angelilli
Julio Añoveros Trias de Bes
Bernard Antony
Pedro Aparicio Sánchez
Javier Areitio Toledo
Stylianos Argyros
Miguel Arias Cañete
Aldo Arroni
Corrado Augias
Paraskevas Avgerinos
Claudio Azzolini

B
Jean Baggioni
Francesco Baldarelli
Monica Baldi
Valerio Baldini
Richard Balfe
Mary Banotti
Otto Bardong
Enrique Barón Crespo
José Barros Moura
Christine Barthet-Mayer
Roger Barton
Roberto Barzanti
Jean-Pierre Bazin
Jean-Pierre Bébéar
Francisca Bennasar Tous
Rolf Berend
Pervenche Berés
Maria Berger
Pierre Bernard-Reymond
Antoine-François Bernardini
Jan Bertens
Georges Berthu
Fausto Bertinotti
Gerardo Bianco
Angela Billingham
Freddy Blak
Undine-Uta Bloch von Blottnitz
Johannes Blokland
Yvan Blot
Reimer Böge
Herbert Bösch
Jens-Peter Bonde
Gian Boniperti
Rinaldo Bontempi
Johanna Boogerd-Quaak
Umberto Bossi
Gerhard Botz
Jean-Louis Bourlanges
David Bowe
Hiltrud Breyer
Laurens Brinkhorst
Elmar Brok
Carlos Bru Purón
Stéphane Buffetaut
Staffan Burenstam Linder
Giovanni Burtone

C
Jesús Cabezón Alonso
Christian Cabrol
Ernesto Caccavale
Luigi Caligaris
Felipe Camisón Asensio
António Campos
Luis Campoy Zueco
Carlos Candal
Maria Cardona
Marie-Arlette Carlotti
Gunilla Carlsson
Carlos Carnero González
Pierre Carniti
Hélène Carrère d'Encausse
Gaetano Carrozzo
Hadar Cars
Pier Casini
Carlo Casini
Bryan Cassidy
Bernard Castagnede
Pierluigi Castagnetti
Luciana Castellina
Frits Castricum
Gérard Caudron
Charlotte Cederschiöld
Marco Cellai
Ozan Ceyhun
Raphaël Chanterie
Raymond Chesa
Giles Chichester
Efthymios Christodoulou
Kenneth Coates
Carlos Coelho
Daniel Cohn-Bendit
Luigi Colajanni
Juan Colino Salamanca
Ombretta Colli
Kenneth Collins
Gerry Collins
Joan Colom I Naval
Maria Colombo Svevo
Richard Corbett
Petrus Cornelissen
Quinido Correia
John Corrie
Carlos Costa Neves
Jean-Pierre Cot
Jean-Louis Cottigny
Pat Cox
Peter Crampton
Christine Crawley
Brian Crowley
Arlindo Cunha
Tony Cunningham
John Cushnahan

D
Gérard d'Aboville
Hedy d'Ancona
Georges de Brémond d'Ars
Elisa Damião
Alessandro Danesin
Pieter Dankert
Danielle Darras
Michel Dary
Katerina Daskalaki
Wayne David
Willy De Clercq
Philippe De Coene
Laura De Esteban Martin
Biagio De Giovanni
Stefano De Luca
Eurico De Melo
Francis Decourriere
Claude Delcroix
Gianfranco Dell'Alba
Marie-José Denys
Gérard Deprez
Edouard Des Places
Claude Desama
Pietro Di Prima
Karel Dillen
Giorgos Dimitrakopoulos
Jacques Donnay
Brendan Donnelly
Alan Donnelly
Jörn Donner
Bárbara Dührkop Dührkop
Olivier Duhamel
Olivier Dupuis
Lone Dybkjær
Charles de Gaulle
Henri de Lassus Saint Genies
Marie-France de Rose

E
Michl Ebner
Doeke Eisma
Dietrich Elchlepp
James Elles
Michael Elliott
Mireille Elmalan
Vassilis Ephremidis
Marianne Eriksson
Manuel Escola Hernando
José Escudero
María Estevan Bolea
Harald Ettl
Robert Evans
Winifred Ewing

F
Juan Fabra Vallés
Hervé Fabre-Aubrespy
Alexander Falconer
Giulio Fantuzzi
Gipo Farassino
Raimondo Fassa
Ben Fayot
Markus Ferber
Daniel Féret
Fernando Fernández Martín
Gerardo Fernández-Albor
Concepció Ferrer
Enrico Ferri
Livio Filippi
Gianfranco Fini
Jim Fitzsimons
Marialiese Flemming
Karl-Heinz Florenz
Luigi Florio
Nicole Fontaine
Alessandro Fontana
Glyn Ford
Marco Formentini
Antoinette Fouque
André Fourcans
Carmen Fraga Estévez
Ingo Friedrich
Friedhelm Frischenschlager
Manuela Frutos Gama
Honor Funk

G
Michael Gahler
Per Gahrton
Gerardo Galeote Quecedo
Pat "the Cope" Gallagher
Ludivina García Arias
José García-Margallo y Marfil
Riccardo Garosci
Georges Garot
Salvador Garriga Polledo
Carles-Alfred Gasòliba I Böhm
Evelyne Gebhardt
Fiorella Ghilardotti
Jean-Antoine Giansily
José Gil-Robles Gil-Delgado
Alan Gillis
José Girão Pereira
Norbert Glante
Anne-Karin Glase
Robert Goedbloed
Lutz Goepel
Charles Goerens
Willi Görlach
Bruno Gollnisch
Alfred Gomolka
Laura González Álvarez
Antonio González Triviño
Friedrich-Wilhelm Graefe zu Baringdorf
Ilona Graenitz
Antonio Graziani
Pauline Green
Lissy Gröner
Mathieu Grosch
Françoise Grossetête
Maren Günther
Armelle Guinebertiere
Antoni Gutiérrez Díaz

H
Bertel Haarder
Karl Habsburg-Lothringen
Klaus Hänsch
Gerhard Hager
David Hallam
José Happart
Veronica Hardstaff
Lyndon Harrison
Konstantinos Hatzidakis
Jutta Haug
Heidi Hautala
Hilde Hawlicek
Renate Heinisch
Mark Hendrick
Fernand Herman
Marie-Thérèse Hermange
Jorge Hernandez Mollar
Philippe Herzog
Michael Hindley
Magdalene Hoff
Ulf Holm
Karsten Hoppenstedt
Jean-François Hory
Richard Howitt
Ian Hudghton
Stephen Hughes
Anneli Hulthén
John Hume
Liam Hyland

I
Raimo Ilaskivi
Inna Ilivitzky
Renzo Imbeni
John Iversen
Juan Izquierdo Collado
María Izquierdo Rojo

J
Caroline Jackson
James Janssen van Raay
Georg Jarzembowski
Thierry Jean-Pierre
Lis Jensen
Kirsten Jensen
Karin Jöns
Salvador Jové Peres
Karin Junker

K
Nikitas Kaklamanis
Anna Karamanou
Roger Karoutchi
Giorgos Katiforis
Edward Kellett-Bowman
Hedwig Keppelhoff-Wiechert
Hugh Kerr
Marie-Paule Kestelijn-Sierens
Mark Killilea Jnr
Heinz Kindermann
Glenys Kinnock
Peter Kittelmann
Eva Kjer Hansen
Christa Klaß
Konstadinos Klironomos
Dieter-Lebrecht Koch
Niels Kofoed
Angela Kokkola
Christoph Konrad
Ole Krarup
Constanze Krehl
Wolfgang Kreissl-Dörfler
Frode Kristoffersen
Johann Kronberger
Wilfried Kuckelkorn
Annemarie Kuhn
Helmut Kuhne

L
Giorgio La Malfa
Carlos Lage
Jan Lagendijk
André Laignel
Catherine Lalumiere
Irini Lambraki
Panayotis Lambrias
Carl Lang
Bernd Lange
Werner Langen
Brigitte Langenhagen
Paul Lannoye
Jessica Larive
Pierre Lataillade
Ritva Laurila
Jean-Marie Le Chevallier
Jean-Yves Le Gallou
Jean-Marie Le Pen
Fernand Le Rachinel
Bernard Lehideux
Klaus-Heiner Lehne
Marlene Lenz
Giacomo Leopardi
Odile Leperre-Verrier
Marie-Noëlle Lienemann
Peter Liese
Giancarlo Ligabue
Michèle Lindeperg
Malou Lindholm
Hans Lindqvist
Rolf Linkohr
Franz Linser
Maj-Lis Lööw
Alfred Lomas
Günter Lüttge
Klaus Lukas
Astrid Lulling

M
Nelly Maes
Johanna Maij-Weggen
Kurt Malangré
Franco Malerba
Bernie Malone
Lucio Manisco
Thomas Mann
Erika Mann
Andrea Manzella
Marilena Marin
Luis Marinho
Elena Marinucci
Alfonso Marra
Pedro Marset Campos
Wilfried Martens
Philippe-Armand Martin
David Martin
Jean-Claude Martinez
Graham Mather
Marjo Matikainen-Kallström
Xaver Mayer
Linda McAvan
Arlene McCarthy
Joe McCartin
Michael McGowan
Anne McIntosh
Patricia McKenna
Hugh McMahon
Edward McMillan-Scott
Eryl McNally
Manuel Medina Ortega
Thomas Megahy
Bruno Mégret
José Mendes Bota
Iñigo Méndez de Vigo
José Mendiluce Pereiro
Nélio Mendonça
Winfried Menrad
Alman Metten
Roberto Mezzaroma
Bill Miller
Joaquim Miranda
Ana Miranda De Lage
Abdelkader Mohamed Ali
Peter Mombaur
Philippe Monfils
Fernando Moniz
James Moorhouse
Gisèle Moreau
Luigi Moretti
Eluned Morgan
David Morris
Giuseppe Mottola
Nana Mouskouri
Edith Müller
Jan Mulder
Simon Murphy
Cristiana Muscardini
Sebastiano Musumeci
Marie-Thérèse Mutin
Riitta Myller

N
Pasqualina Napoletano
Hartmut Nassauer
Clive Needle
Riccardo Nencini
Stan Newens
Edward Newman
Annemie Neyts-Uyttebroeck
Jim Nicholson
Jean-Thomas Nordmann
Honório Novo

O
Christine Oddy
Karl-Erik Olsson
Ria Oomen-Ruijten
Arie Oostlander
Leoluca Orlando
Jyrki Otila

P
Reino Paasilinna
Pertti Paasio
Doris Pack
Aline Pailler
Ian Paisley
Ana Palacio Vallelersundi
Veronika Palm
Stylianos Panagopoulos
Nikolaos Papakyriazis
Mihalis Papagiannakis
Gastone Parigi
Eolo Parodi
Jean-Claude Pasty
Karla Peijs
Fernando Pérez Royo
Roy Perry
Helwin Peter
Luciano Pettinari
Peter Pex
Wilhelm Piecyk
Carlos Pimenta
Eric Pinel
Hubert Pirker
Elly Plooij-Van Gorsel
Lord Plumb
Guido Podestà
Hans-Gert Poettering
Danilo Poggiolini
Samuli Pohjamo
Anne Poisson
Anita Pollack
José Pomés Ruiz
Alain Pompidou
Josep Pons Grau
Manuel Porto
José Posada González
Bernd Posselt
Pierre Pradier
Bartho Pronk
James Provan
Alonso Puerta

Q
Jean Querbes
Godelieve Quisthoudt-Rowohl

R
Reinhard Rack
Juan Ramírez-Heredia
Christa Randzio-Plath
Bernhard Rapkay
Daniela Raschhofer
Giuseppe Rauti
Imelda Read
Viviane Reding
Encarnación Redondo Jiménez
Klaus Rehder
Sérgio Ribeiro
Karin Riis-Jørgensen
Günter Rinsche
Carlo Ripa Di Meana
Carlos Robles Piquer
Michel Rocard
Raúl Rosado Fernandes
Dagmar Roth-Behrendt
Mechtild Rothe
Willi Rothley
Yoannis Roubatis
Christian Rovsing
Paul Rübig
Giorgio Ruffolo
Mirja Ryynänen

S
André Sainjon
Dominique Saint-Pierre
Jannis Sakellariou
José Salafranca Sánchez-Neyra
Detlev Samland
Ulla Sandbæk
Yvonne Sandberg-Fries
Giacomo Santini
Francisco Sanz Fernández
Pavlos Sarlis
Francisca Sauquillo Pérez del Arco
Umberto Scapagnini
Michel Scarbonchi
Axel Schäfer
Anne-Marie Schaffner
Edgar Schiedermeier
Agnes Schierhuber
Luciano Schifone
Marcel Schlechter
Ursula Schleicher
Poul Schlüter
Gerhard Schmid
Barbara Schmidbauer
Horst Schnellhardt
Inger Schörling
Jürgen Schröder
Elisabeth Schroedter
Martin Schulz
Konrad Schwaiger
Barry Seal
Carlo Secchi
Françoise Seillier
Esko Seppänen
Peter Sichrovsky
Angela Sierra González
Brian Simpson
Niels Sindal
Joaquín Sisó Cruellas
Jonas Sjöstedt
Peter Skinner
Alex Smith
Irene Soltwedel-Schäfer
Jan Sonneveld
María Sornosa Martínez
Dominique Souchet
André Soulier
Antoinette Spaak
Roberto Speciale
Tom Spencer
Shaun Spiers
Per Stenmarck
Ursula Stenzel
Dirk Sterckx
John Stevens
Jack Stewart-Clark
Marie-France Stirbois
Ulrich Stockmann
Frédéric Striby
Robert Sturdy
Jörn Svensson
Johannes Swoboda

T
Antonio Tajani
Gianni Tamino
Christof Tannert
Michael Tappin
Salvatore Tatarella
Christiane Taubira-Delannon
Wilfried Telkämper
Anna Terrón I Cusí
Robin Teverson
Diemut Theato
Ioannis Theonas
Maj Theorin
David Thomas
Astrid Thors
Marianne Thyssen
Stanislaw Tillich
Leo Tindemans
Gary Titley
Luisa Todini
John Tomlinson
Carole Tongue
José Torres Couto
D. Torres Marques
Antonios Trakatellis
Antonio Trizza
Peter Truscott
Dimitris Tsatsos

U
Wolfgang Ullmann

V
Leonie van Bladel
Rijk van Dam
Otto von Habsburg
Maartje van Putten
Paavo Väyrynen
Jaime Valdivielso De Cué
Joan Vallvé
José Valverde López
Anne Van Lancker
Frank Vanhecke
Daniel Varela Suanzes-Carpegna
D. Vaz Da Silva
Luciano Vecchi
W.G. van Velzen
Wim van Velzen
Josep Verde I Aldea
Yves Verwaerde
Guido Viceconte
Luigi Vinci
Vincenzo Viola
Ivar Virgin
Kyösti Virrankoski
Johannes Voggenhuber

W
Karl von Wogau
Susan Waddington
Ralf Walter
Graham Watson
Mark Watts
Jup Weber
Barbara Weiler
Rosemarie Wemheuer
Ian White
Phillip Whitehead
Sören Wibe
Jan Wiebenga
Rainer Wieland
Jan Wiersma
Florus Wijsenbeek
Frederik Willockx
Joe Wilson
Friedrich Wolf
Francis Wurtz
Terence Wynn

Z
Wilmya Zimmermann

See also
 1994 European Parliament election
 Members of the European Parliament 1994–1999